Sarat Sumpradit (born 17 April 1994) is a Thai weightlifter who competes in the 94 kg division. He won a gold medal at the 2013 Southeast Asian Games and placed fourth at the 2014 Asian Games and 2016 Olympics.

References

1994 births
Living people
Sarat Sumpradit
Sarat Sumpradit
Weightlifters at the 2016 Summer Olympics
Universiade medalists in weightlifting
Sarat Sumpradit
Southeast Asian Games medalists in weightlifting
Asian Games medalists in weightlifting
Sarat Sumpradit
Weightlifters at the 2014 Asian Games
Weightlifters at the 2018 Asian Games
Medalists at the 2018 Asian Games
Competitors at the 2013 Southeast Asian Games
Universiade bronze medalists for Thailand
Sarat Sumpradit